The following is a list of works by Japanese filmmaker and artist Masaaki Yuasa, divided into the categories of works where he primarily served in an animation or artistic capacity, his filmography of projects where he had directorial or substantive creative control, and his published works in print.

Works as an animator/artist

Filmography

Published works

References

Director filmographies
Japanese filmographies